USS Superior was built for the War of 1812, and was named after one of the Great Lakes. Superior was a U.S. Navy frigate built in 1814 at Sackets Harbor, New York, by Henry Eckford, and was laid down in February 1814 and launched on 2 May of the same year.

Operations on Lake Ontario 
Built for service in Commodore Isaac Chauncey's squadron on Lake Ontario, Superior was commanded by Lt. John H. Elton. She joined the squadron in late July off the English base at Kingston, Ontario. The frigate operated there through the summer as Chauncey blockaded Kingston, hoping to lure Sir James Yeo's fleet out for a decisive action. 

Late in September, Superior helped transport General Izzard and some 3,000 troops from Sackets Harbor to Genesee, New York. She returned briefly to Kingston before sailing back to Sackets Harbor for the winter.

Post-war deactivation  
Before warm weather returned, peace ended naval operations on Lake Ontario. Superior was laid up at Sackets Harbor and sold sometime before 1824.

References 

 

War of 1812 ships of the United States
Superior (1814)
Ships built in Sackets Harbor, New York
1814 ships
Lake Superior